Valentina Razzauti (born 26 March 1998) is an Italian female canoeist who won four medals at senior level of the Wildwater Canoeing World Championships and European Wildwater Championships with the total of seventeen international medals.

References

External links
 

1998 births
Living people
Italian female canoeists